Thomas N. Miller was a Scottish amateur footballer who played in the Scottish League for Queen's Park, Rangers and Arthurlie as a forward.

Personal life 
Miller served as a private in the Royal Air Force during the First World War.

Career statistics

References 

Scottish footballers
Queen's Park F.C. players
Year of death missing
Scottish Football League players
Place of birth missing
Year of birth missing
Royal Air Force personnel of World War I
Rangers F.C. players
Arthurlie F.C. players
Association football forwards